In mathematics, the symmetry of second derivatives (also called the equality of mixed partials) refers to the possibility of interchanging the order of taking partial derivatives of a function

of n variables without changing the result under certain conditions (see below). The symmetry is the assertion that the second-order partial derivatives satisfy the identity

so that they form an n × n symmetric matrix, known as the function's Hessian matrix. This is sometimes known as Schwarz's theorem, Clairaut's theorem, or Young's theorem.

In the context of partial differential equations it is called the Schwarz integrability condition.

Formal expressions of symmetry 
In symbols, the symmetry may be expressed as:

Another notation is:

In terms of composition of the differential operator  which takes the partial derivative with respect to :

.

In fact smooth functions are another valid domain.

History 
The result on the equality of mixed partial derivatives under certain conditions has a long history. The list of unsuccessful proposed proofs started with Euler's, published in 1740, although already in 1721 Bernoulli had implicitly assumed the result with no formal justification. Clairaut also published a proposed proof in 1740, with no other attempts until the end of the 18th century. Starting then, for a period of 70 years, a number of incomplete proofs were proposed. Other attempts were made by P. Blanchet (1841), Duhamel (1856), Sturm (1857), Schlömilch (1862), and Bertrand (1864). Finally in 1867 Lindelöf systematically analyzed all the earlier flawed proofs and was able to exhibit a specific counterexample where mixed derivatives failed to be equal.

Six years after that, Schwarz succeeded in giving the first rigorous proof. Dini later contributed by finding more general conditions than those of Schwarz. Eventually a clean and more general version was found by Jordan in 1883 that is still the proof found in most textbooks. Minor variants of earlier proofs were published by Laurent (1885), Peano (1889 and 1893), J. Edwards (1892), P. Haag (1893), J. K. Whittemore (1898), Vivanti (1899) and Pierpont (1905). Further progress was made in 1907-1909 when E. W. Hobson and W. H. Young found proofs with weaker conditions than those of Schwarz and Dini. In 1918, Carathéodory gave a different proof based on the Lebesgue integral.

Schwarz's theorem 

The partial derivatives of this function commute at that point.

An elementary proof for functions on open subsets of the plane is as follows (by a simple reduction, the general case for the theorem of Schwarz easily reduces to the planar case).

By the mean value theorem, for fixed  and  non-zero,   can be found in the open interval  with

Since , the first equality below can be divided by :

This account is a straightforward classical method found in many text books, for example in Burkill, Apostol and Rudin.
 
Although the derivation above is elementary, the approach can also be viewed from a more conceptual perspective so that the result becomes more apparent.

By the fundamental theorem of calculus for  functions  on an open interval  with 

Hence

.

This is a generalized version of the mean value theorem.

For vector-valued functions with  a finite-dimensional normed space, there is no analogue of the equality above, indeed it fails. But since , the inequality above is a useful substitute.

.

These versions of the mean valued theorem are discussed in Rudin, Hörmander and elsewhere.

Furthermore for  set

.

Remark. By two applications of the classical mean value theorem,

Thus the first elementary proof can be reinterpreted using difference operators. Conversely, instead of using the generalized mean value theorem in the second proof, the classical mean valued theorem could be used.

Proof of Clairaut's theorem using iterated integrals 
The properties of repeated Riemann integrals of a continuous function  on a compact rectangle  are easily established. It follows that

;

moreover it is immediate that the iterated integral is positive if  is positive. The equality above is a simple case of Fubini's theorem, involving no measure theory.  proves it in a straightforward way using Riemann approximating sums corresponding to subdivisions of a rectangle into smaller rectangles.

To prove Clairaut's theorem, assume  is a differentiable function on an open set , for which the mixed second partial derivatives  and  exist and are continuous. Using the fundamental theorem of calculus twice,

Similarly

The two iterated integrals are therefore equal. However, if the iterated integral of a continuous function function  vanishes for all rectangles, then  must be identically zero; for otherwise  or  would be strictly positive at some point and therefore by continuity on a rectangle, which is not possible. Hence  must vanish identically, so that  everywhere.

Sufficiency of twice-differentiability 
A weaker condition than the continuity of second partial derivatives (which is implied by the latter) which suffices to ensure symmetry is that all partial derivatives are themselves differentiable. Another strengthening of the theorem, in which existence of the permuted mixed partial is asserted, was provided by Peano in a short 1890 note on Mathesis:

Distribution theory formulation 

The theory of distributions (generalized functions) eliminates analytic problems with the symmetry. The derivative of an integrable function can always be defined as a distribution, and symmetry of mixed partial derivatives always holds as an equality of distributions. The use of formal integration by parts to define differentiation of distributions puts the symmetry question back onto the test functions, which are smooth and certainly satisfy this symmetry. In more detail (where f is a distribution, written as an operator on test functions, and φ is a test function),
 

Another approach, which defines the Fourier transform of a function, is to note that on such transforms partial derivatives become multiplication operators that commute much more obviously.

Requirement of continuity 
The symmetry may be broken if the function fails to have differentiable partial derivatives, which is possible if Clairaut's theorem is not satisfied (the second partial derivatives are not continuous).

An example of non-symmetry is the function (due to Peano)

This can be visualized by the polar form ; it is everywhere continuous, but its derivatives at  cannot be computed algebraically.

In contrast, along the y-axis the x-derivative , and so .

The above function, written in a cylindrical coordinate system, can be expressed as

showing that the function oscillates four times when traveling once around an arbitrarily small loop containing the origin. Intuitively, therefore, the local behavior of the function at (0, 0) cannot be described as a quadratic form, and the Hessian matrix thus fails to be symmetric.

In general, the interchange of limiting operations need not commute. Given two variables near  and two limiting processes on

corresponding to making h → 0 first, and to making k → 0 first. It can matter, looking at the first-order terms, which is applied first. This leads to the construction of pathological examples in which second derivatives are non-symmetric. This kind of example belongs to the theory of real analysis where the pointwise value of functions matters.  When viewed as a distribution the second partial derivative's values can be changed at an arbitrary set of points as long as this has Lebesgue measure 0. Since in the example the Hessian is symmetric everywhere except , there is no contradiction with the fact that the Hessian, viewed as a Schwartz distribution, is symmetric.

In Lie theory 
Consider the first-order differential operators Di to be infinitesimal operators on Euclidean space. That is, Di in a sense generates the one-parameter group of translations parallel to the xi-axis. These groups commute with each other, and therefore the infinitesimal generators do also; the Lie bracket

 [Di, Dj] = 0

is this property's reflection. In other words, the Lie derivative of one coordinate with respect to another is zero.

Application to differential forms 
The Clairaut-Schwarz theorem is the key fact needed to prove that for every  (or at least twice differentiable) differential form , the second exterior derivative vanishes: .  This implies that every differentiable exact form (i.e., a form  such that  for some form ) is closed (i.e.), since .

In the middle of the 18th century, the theory of differential forms was first studied in the simplest case of 1-forms in the plane, i.e. The study of 1-forms and the differentials of functions began with Clairaut's papers in 1739 and 1740. At that stage his investigations were interpreted as ways of solving ordinary differential equations. Formally Clairaut showed that a 1-form  on an open rectangle is closed, i.e. , if and only  has the form  for some function  in the disk. The solution for  can be written by Cauchy's integral formula

while if , the closed property  is the identity . (In modern language this is one version of the Poincaré lemma.)

Notes

References 

 (reprinted 1978)

Further reading 
 

Multivariable calculus
Generalized functions
Symmetry
Theorems in analysis